Anton Quni (born 9 June 1967), is the Kosovan Albanian and former Minister of Defense of Kosovo and of the Kosovo Security Forces (KSF), as well as the former Commander of the Kosovo Liberation Army (KLA).

Career
He studied at the Military Academy in Belgrade and with the highest grades was promoted as a career officer with the Yugoslav People's Army. With the dissolution of Yugoslavia, he went to live in Switzerland and Croatia. When war erupted in Kosovo in 1998, Antoni left Switzerland to take part. He joined the Kosovo Liberation Army (KLA) under the command of the Minister of War, Colonel Ahmet Krasniqi. With his unit, he conducted successful military operations in breaking the Yugoslav-Albanian border, in Koshare. Quni along with commanders Agim Ramadani, Sali Çekaj, Xhemajl Fetahu, and other soldiers took part in the historic victory against the Yugoslav Army in the Battle of Koshare. Since 2010, Quni has been a strong voice of the citizens in the Kosovo Parliament.

After the war, he served in the Kosovo Protection Corps and Kosovo Security Forces. From 2010 to 2017, he was Member of Parliament Commission for Internal Affairs, Security and Oversight of the Kosovo Security Forces. From 2017 to 2019, he was Member of Parliament Commission for Oversight of Kosovo Intelligence Agency.

He was the Chairman of the Democratic League of Kosovo Party for Prizren from 9 September 2017 to 14 March 2021.

Personal
Anton Quni is married to a Croatian women with whom he has four children.

Notes

References 

1967 births
20th-century Albanian military personnel
20th-century Albanian people
Defence ministers of Kosovo
Democratic League of Kosovo politicians
Kosovo Albanians
Kosovo Liberation Army soldiers
Members of the Assembly of the Republic of Kosovo
Living people